In Henningsen v. Bloomfield Motors, Inc., 32 N.J. 358, 161 A.2d 69 (N.J. 1960), the New Jersey Supreme Court held that an automobile manufacturer's attempt to use an express warranty that disclaimed an implied warranty of merchantability was invalid.

Facts 
On May 7, 1955, Mr. Claus H. Henningsen purchased a Plymouth automobile, manufactured by Chrysler Corporation, from Bloomfield Motors, Inc. The automobile was intended as a Mother's Day gift to his wife, Helen, and the purchase was executed solely by Mr. Henningsen.

The contract for sale was a one-page form and contained paragraphs in various type sizes on the front and back of the form. Mr. Henningsen testified he did not read all paragraphs of the contract. The back of the contract contained the following clause:

The manufacturer warrants each new motor vehicle (including original equipment placed thereon by the manufacturer except tires), chassis or parts manufactured by it to be free from defects in material or workmanship under normal use and service. Its obligation under this warranty being limited to making good at its factory any part or parts thereof which shall, within ninety (90) days after delivery of such vehicle To the original purchaser or before such vehicle has been driven 4,000 miles, whichever event shall first occur, be returned to it with transportation charges prepaid and which its examination shall disclose to its satisfaction to have been thus defective; This warranty being expressly in lieu of all other warranties expressed or implied, and all other obligations or liabilities on its part, and it neither assumes nor authorizes any other person to assume for it any other liability in connection with the sale of its vehicles.

The car was delivered on May 9, 1955. There were no problems with the car until May 19, 1955. On that day, Mrs. Henningsen was driving the car at 20-22 mph on a smooth two lane highway. Mrs. Henningsen then heard a loud noise, the steering wheel spun in her hands, and the car suddenly veered and collided with a wall. The car was damaged severely, and declared totaled by the Henningsens' insurance carrier.

The defendants refused to repair the car under warranty since they claimed the express warranty was limited only to repairing the defective parts and that it was not liable for damages caused by defective parts.

Procedure 
Mr. and Mrs. Henningsen sued under a theory of negligence and a theory of warranty. The court felt the proof was not sufficient to make out a prima facie case of negligence and gave the case to the jury solely on the warranty theory. The jury returned a verdict for the plaintiffs, Mr. and Mrs. Henningsen, against both defendants. The appellate case was argued on December 7, 1959 and was decided on May 9, 1960.

Holding 
Automobile purchasers may recover for damages caused by defective parts under an implied warranty of merchantability since automobile manufacturers and dealers may not limit this warranty to replacement of only defective parts as this violates fair dealing and public policy.

Reasoning 
Automobiles were sold by the automobile manufacturer to the automobile dealer, who in turn sells them to consumers. Therefore, there is no privity between the automobile manufacturer and the consumer. While a majority of courts, at this time, hold privity is required for the manufacturer to be liable to the consumer, there is a trend towards eliminating privity as a requirement. It is unjust for the manufacturer to benefit from advertising their product as suitable as a car and profit from this representation, while providing a basic implied warranty that what they are providing matches what they represent they are providing. Therefore, an implied warranty accompanies every car the manufacturer puts into the stream of trade.

The express warranty signed by Mr. Henningsen will apply under contract law even if he did not read all of it. The warranty agreement, which is a standard used by all major automobile manufacturers, seems to disguise the limitations of the warranty coverage. The jury verdict at trial established this disclaimer was not fairly obtained, and, therefore, the disclaimer will not apply to the situation at hand. Therefore, damages under implied warranty will stand.

Further, the contract is one of adhesion and Mr. Henningsen had no chance to bargain on its terms. The defendants took advantage of their relative bargaining power to force unfair disclaimers upon the customer, and since this disclaimer of any warranty except one for replacement of defective parts violates public policy.

Commentary 
Some law and economics scholars have criticized this result as it will ultimately raise prices as automobile manufacturers and dealers have to pay for implied warranty costs. This results in an economically inefficient transaction since not all consumers wanted this warranty, but now all consumers are forced to pay for it.

New Jersey courts, attorneys and scholars frequently cite Henningsen as the landmark case that established strict liability for defective products in the United States. However, the majority of US courts, attorneys, and law professors usually cite Escola v. Coca-Cola Bottling Co. and the Supreme Court of California as the source of the doctrine.  

Although Henningsen helped articulate the rationale for the then-imminent shift from implied warranty to strict liability as the dominant theory of American product liability, the case never actually imposes "strict liability" or "absolute liability" for defective products.

References

External links
 

Law and economics
New Jersey state case law
United States contract case law
1960 in United States case law
1960 in New Jersey
Plymouth (automobile)
Bloomfield, New Jersey
Product liability case law
Automotive safety